The violet turaco, also known as the violaceous plantain eater (Musophaga violacea), is a large turaco, a group of African otidimorphae.

Characteristics
These are unmistakable birds, but shy and often inconspicuous in the treetops. The plumage is glossy violet, except for the yellow forehead, chestnut crown and white ear coverts; the bill is thick and red. In flight, the violet turaco's crimson primary flight feathers contrast with the violet plumage. The red colour in the wings is typical of turacos.

Habitat
It is resident in West Africa, and has an extremely large range from Senegal through to the Nigeria, with an isolated population in Chad and Central African Republic. It occurs in tropical savannas, wetlands, woodlands and forests.

Diet
Diet consists of fruit, and they are quite partial to figs, but they will also eat leaves, buds, flowers, insects, snails and slugs.

Reproduction
Cooperative breeding behavior has been observed in captivity in this species. The female lays two eggs in a flimsy tree platform nest.

Threats
This species is locally common, but is vulnerable to trapping for the pet trade in Guinea, Sierra Leone, Liberia and Ghana.

Behavior
Turacos are social birds, travelling in flocks of around ten to twelve individuals. They are not strong fliers, preferring to hop along branches. When threatened, they can run quickly through the trees. The violet turaco has a loud “” call.

Gallery

References

Birds of The Gambia by Barlow, Wacher and Disley,  
Violaceous plantain eater (Musophaga violacea) http://www.torontozoo.com/explorethezoo/AnimalDetails.asp?pg=436

External links

Extract of an article about Violaceous Touracos  on International Touraco Society website.
Fact sheet from Toronto Zoo: http://www.torontozoo.com/Animals/details.asp?AnimalID=436

Tauraco
Birds of West Africa
violet turaco
Taxobox binomials not recognized by IUCN